Katharine Gibbs College was a for-profit institution of higher learning based in the United States of America, founded by Katharine Gibbs.

A few years later, the institution expanded with satellite campuses in Boston, Massachusetts, New York City and Montclair, New Jersey, and was renamed for its founder. It specialized in education in industries such as design, business administration, computer technology, criminal justice, and health care.

The college was nationally accredited by the Accrediting Council for Independent Colleges and Schools. The Accrediting Council for Independent Colleges and Schools is recognized by the Council for Higher Education Accreditation as a National Career-Related Accrediting Organization.  Recognition by CHEA affirms that the standards and processes of the accrediting organization are consistent with the academic quality, improvement and accountability expectations that CHEA has established, including the eligibility standard that the majority of institutions or programs each accredits are degree-granting.

Crowell Collier and Macmillan acquired Katharine Gibbs School in 1968. In 1989, Macmillan sold the schools to Phillips Colleges. K-III Communications acquired the school from Phillips in 1994. In 1997, The Career Education Corporation (CEC) acquired the Gibbs Group. In , it began shutting down the campuses after a failed effort to sell the Gibbs franchise.

History 
In 1911, Katharine Gibbs and her sister Mary Ryan opened their first secretarial school in Providence, Rhode Island. Initially, the school was not marketed specifically to women, but labor shortages from World War I pushed more women into the work space and, by 1917, the school was advertising “Secretarial Training for Educated Women”. The Gibbs schools promoted a message of female empowerment, while focusing on the type of education that would be most valuable to women at the time. The Gibbs schools promoted the ideas that secretarial training was the path to a career for women. Capitalizing on gender-based restrictions of the time, Gibbs created an educational empire.

To set it apart from other secretarial schools of the era, the Gibbs school was marketed as selecting only women of a high socioeconomic status, making them highly appealing to young women from elite backgrounds. Gibbs distinguished her schools from her competitors, and she did so by offering courses in dressing appropriately, serving tea, and other societal refinements.

With the rise of feminism in the 1960s and 1970s secretarial schools began to fade. The decline of the Gibbs school as an elite option for women was the result of its own gender-based marketing tactics. In 1968, the Gibbs family sold the schools to corporate buyers, who worked to transition the schools' identity.

After being sold it specialized in education in industries such as graphical design, business administration, computer technology, criminal justice, and health care (medical assistants). It was a less-than-two-year college that did not offer tracks or classes in fields such as psychology, mathematics, or other four-year degree classes. None of the credits earned at the school were transferable to a four-year college due to lack of properly vetted teachers and the for-profit nature of the school.

Former locations

Gibbs College locations:
 Cranston, Rhode Island - originally located in Providence, Rhode Island
 Tysons Corner, Virginia
 Livingston, New Jersey
 Boston, Massachusetts
 Norwalk, Connecticut

Katharine Gibbs School locations:
 New York City
 Norristown, Pennsylvania
 Philadelphia, Pennsylvania
 Montclair, New Jersey
 Piscataway Township, New Jersey
 Melville, New York
 Chicago, Illinois

Controversy
In January 2007, the New York State Education Department reported deficiencies at the Katharine Gibbs New York campus. The problems related to faculty qualifications and remedial course offerings. New enrollment was limited and the Education Department stated it would close the college if improvements were not made.

Closure
In the fall of 2006, the Illinois-based Career Education Corporation announced that the entire Gibbs College division was being put up for sale.  Over the next year, no buyer could be found, so on Thursday, February 14, 2008, Career Education Corporation announced that it would convert three of the nine campuses in the Gibbs division (Boston, Massachusetts, Virginia, and Melville, New York) to its Sanford-Brown College brand and "teach out" the remaining schools in the division. Those seven campuses were scheduled to close in December 2009. Students were still being admitted into the Melville, New York, campus which had been reflagged as "SBI Campus, an affiliate of Sanford-Brown". It was announced in 2013 that the Virginia operation was being shut down.

Academic transcript requests are fulfilled through Parchment Exchange. Parchment Exchange manages processing and delivery; Career Education Corporation or the custodial school of records retains the official transcript data.  The National Student Clearinghouse is an authorized agent for providing degree and enrollment verification.

References

Further reading 
 Doherty, Rose A., Katharine Gibbs: Beyond White Gloves, CreateSpace Independent Publishing Platform, May 2014. 

Former for-profit universities and colleges in the United States
Educational institutions established in 1911
Career Education Corporation
Educational institutions disestablished in 2009